Schuyler Antony Carron (August 24, 1921 – June 15, 1964) was an American bobsledder who competed in the late 1940s. He won the bronze medal in the two-man event at the 1948 Winter Olympics in St. Moritz.

References
Bobsleigh two-man Olympic medalists 1932-56 and since 1964
DatabaseOlympics.com profile

1921 births
1964 deaths
American male bobsledders
Bobsledders at the 1948 Winter Olympics
Olympic bronze medalists for the United States in bobsleigh
Medalists at the 1948 Winter Olympics